WILT (103.7 MHz, "Sunny 103.7") is an FM radio station licensed to Wrightsville Beach, North Carolina, United States. The station serves the Wilmington area. The station is currently owned by Capitol Broadcasting Company, Inc., through licensee Sunrise Broadcasting, LLC.

History

93.7 FM
With the original call letters WFXZ-FM, "93.7 The Bone" signed on in November 2000. Owned and operated by Sea-Comm Media Inc., the station was located in the same Wilmington, North Carolina facilities as (modern rock) WSFM-FM "Surf 107" and (rhythmic oldies) WKXB "Jammin 99.9". The original lineup featured a jock-less, all-music morning show, Paul "Sully" Sullivan 10 am – 3 pm, Cameron Post 3–7 pm, and Steve "Knothead" Tighe 7 pm – 12 am. Chris Scharf served as the first program director, with Sully the station's first music director. Shortly after signing on, Sea-Comm brought aboard the syndicated Bob & Tom show (from Indianapolis). The station features included "Led For The Head" (a nightly Led Zeppelin feature), and a series of "Bonehead Parties" at local bars.

103.7 FM
WDZD, a country station licensed to Shallotte, North Carolina, was located at 93.5 FM. In 1994, the station increased from 3,000 to 25,000 watts and moved to 103.7 FM. At that time, the call letters were changed to WLTT. The station played soft adult contemporary music for several years, using the names "Love 103.7" and later "Magic 103.7", before switching to modern rock and then talk radio. The WLTT call letters later moved to the former WCCA at 106.3. The 103.7 frequency switched to the WBNU letters and classic rock format of WBNE, at 93.7 FM, which had used the "Bone" name and classic rock format for several years. The WBNE letters went to WBNU when the 93.7 frequency began simulcasting WLTT. The 103.7 frequency got a signal boost to 35,000 watts and a tower closer to Wilmington, aided by a move by WWTB from 103.9 to 104.1 FM.

As of late, the station has broadened its format to include rock from the '90s and today in addition to classic rock.

On March 17, 2014, WBNE changed their format to news/talk, branded as "Port City Radio" (simulcast with WLTT 1180 AM Carolina Beach, North Carolina).

On January 31, 2015, at midnight WBNE switched to a simulcast of adult alternative-formatted WUIN 98.3 FM Oak Island, North Carolina. On June 1, 2015, WBNE went silent. On June 12, 2015, WBNE returned to the air, stunting with a loop of Twiggy Twiggy by Pizzicato Five. On July 3, 2015, the station flipped to Variety Hits as "Big John FM". On November 19, 2015, it was announced WILT's AC format and call sign would move to WBNE as "Sunny 103.7" on December 1, as WILT was sold to a new owner who changed the format on 104.5 to Christian radio.

References

External links

ILT (FM)
Radio stations established in 1977
1977 establishments in North Carolina